Vladislav (; , ;  Russian, Ukrainian, Bulgarian, Macedonian) is a male given name of Slavic origin. Variations include Volodislav, Vlastislav and Vlaslav. In the Czech Republic, Slovakia and Croatia, the common variation is Ladislav.

Outside of Slavic and Eastern Romance countries, it is sometimes latinized as either Vladislaus or Vladislas. Spanish forms include Ladislao and Uladislao. The Portuguese and Romanian forms are Ladislau. The Hungarian form is László.

In Russian-speaking countries, it is usually colloquially shortened to either Vlad (Влад) or Vladik (Владик).

The feminine form of the name Vladislav is Vladislava or, in Polish spelling, Władysława.

Origin 
The name Vladislav literally means 'one who owns a glory', or simply 'famous'. It is a composite name derived from two Slavic roots: Vlad-, meaning either 'to own' (Ukrainian volodity [] means 'to own', Polish  ['to possess'], Russian  [ 'to own']), or 'to rule' (another meaning of Polish władać is 'to rule'. Ukrainian vlada [влада] means 'power', 'the government'; in Slovak and Czech, vláda means ruling body, government in modern form, vládnuť (vládnout) means 'to rule', vládca [vládce] is 'ruler'), and slav-, meaning 'fame'/'glory'. It has also extended into Romania and Moldova, which are non-Slavic countries.

People with the name

Mononymous uses 
Vladislav, a duke of Croatia, 821–c. 835
Ivan Vladislav, emperor of Bulgaria 1015–1018
Vladislaus I, duke of Bohemia 1109–1117, 1120–1125
Vladislaus II (c. 1110–1174), duke and later king of Bohemia 1158–1172
Vladislaus III, duke of Bohemia, 1197; prince of Bohemia and margrave of Moravia, 1197–1222
Stefan Vladislav I, king of Serbia 1234–1243
 Stefan Vladislav II (reigned 1316 to 1325), king of Syrmia
Vladislav of Bosnia, ruler of Banate of Bosnia, died 1354
Vladislav I, ruler of Wallachia 1364–c. 1377
Władysław II Jagiełło (d. 1434), grand duke of Lithuania and king of Poland 1386–1434
Vladislav II, ruler of Wallachia 1447–1456
Vladislaus II of Hungary, king of Bohemia 1471–1516, king of Hungary and Croatia 1490–1516
 Vladislav I Herman of Poland, duke of Poland
 Vladislav the Grammarian (fl. 1456–1479), Bulgarian writer
 Vladislav III of Wallachia (died 1525), ruler of Wallachia
 Vladislav IV of Russia (reigned 1595–1648), king of Poland, grand duke of Lithuania and titular king of Sweden

Given name 
František Vladislav Hek (1769–1847), Czech national revivalist
Władysław Horodecki (1863–1930), Polish architect
Vladislav Artemiev (born 1998), Russian Chess Grandmaster
Vladislav Bajac (born 1954), Serbian writer, journalist, and publisher
Vladislav Bogićević (born 1950), Serbian footballer
Vladislav Bykanov (born 1989), Israeli Olympic short track speed skater
Vladislav Dajković (born 1992), Montenegrin political and activist
Vladislav Jovanović (born 1933), Serbian diplomat
Vladislav Khodasevich (1886–1939), Russian poet
Vladislav Krapivin (1938–2020), Russian writer
Vladislav Kulminski (born 1972), Moldovan politician
Vladislav Listyev, Russian journalist and head of the ORT TV Channel (now government-owned Channel One)
Vladislav Petković Dis (1880–1917), Serbian impressionist poet
Vladislav F. Ribnikar (1871–1914), Serbian journalist, founder of Politika
Vladislav Roslyakov (2000–2018), Russian mass murderer and perpetrator of the 2018 Kerch Polytechnic College massacre
Vladislav Sitnichenko (born 1998), Russian footballer
Vladislav Tretiak (born 1952), Russian ice hockey goaltender
Vladislav Vančura (1891–1942), Czech writer, playwright and film director
Vladyslav Vashchuk (born 1975), Ukrainian footballer

See also
 Vladislava
 Slavic names
 Ladislav
 László

References

External links 
 List of more than 193 famous Vladislavs, in Russian

Belarusian masculine given names
Bulgarian masculine given names
Croatian masculine given names
Czech masculine given names
Moldovan masculine given names
Romanian masculine given names
Russian masculine given names
Serbian masculine given names
Slavic masculine given names
Slovak masculine given names
Slovene masculine given names
Ukrainian masculine given names